Beginnings is a 1973 reissue of the Allman Brothers Band's first two albums, The Allman Brothers Band and Idlewild South, made to capitalize on the band's popularity since those records had first come out.  Beginnings also includes extensive liner notes by writer Jean-Charles Costa that gave many fans their first coherent view of the band's history, as well as useful guidelines for how to tell Duane Allman's guitar parts from Dickey Betts'. The front cover depicts them at one of their many famous performances at the Fillmore East.

For Beginnings, the band's debut album was remixed by Tom Dowd, replacing Adrian Barber's original mix.

Track listing

Personnel 
Personnel on original albums, see:
The Allman Brothers Band
Idlewild South

Personnel of this compilation:
Chuck Pulin – cover and liner photos
Sue Poyneer – album design
Jean-Charles Costa – liner notes

References

1973 compilation albums
Atco Records compilation albums
The Allman Brothers Band compilation albums
Albums produced by Tom Dowd